Drifton is an unincorporated community located in Hazle Township in Luzerne County, Pennsylvania. Drifton is located along Pennsylvania Route 940, northwest of Jeddo and southwest of Freeland.

Notable person
G. Harold Wagner, Pennsylvania State Treasurer and Auditor General

References

Unincorporated communities in Luzerne County, Pennsylvania
Unincorporated communities in Pennsylvania